Sally Arnup (15 July 1930 – 22 December 2015) was an English sculptor known for her depictions of animals. Her studios were located at Holtby, a village near York.

Biography

Arnup was born in London and began studying at the Kingston School of Art at the age of thirteen. She later studied at Camberwell College of Arts and the Royal College of Art where she was taught by both Frank Dobson and John Skeaping. In 1955 she won the Royal Society of British Sculptors' Feodora Gleichen Award for women artists. From 1958 to 1972 Arnup was the Head of Sculpture at York College of Art. Her husband Mick Arnup also taught art at the college. Both Sally Arnup and her husband retired from teaching in 1974 to focus on their artistic careers.

Artworks 
Arnup's speciality as an artist was for bronze animal sculptures, often created with the live animal present.
Among Arnup's most notable commissions was a work for the Duke of Edinburgh’s 80th Birthday, depicting his Fell Pony Storm. In 1971 she cast a silver leopard which was presented to HM Queen Elizabeth II by the City of York. A life-sized sculpture of an Irish Wolfhound by Arnup was posthumously donated to the York Art Gallery in 2017. She regularly exhibited at the Royal Academy in London, with the Royal Society of British Artists, with the Royal Scottish Academy and at the Paris Salon. In 1968 the University of York hosted a solo exhibition of her work as did Gainsborough House in Suffolk during 1998. The Arnup Studio where both Sally and Mick Arnup worked, was opened to the public in 2011 as part of York Open Studios.

Death 
In 2015 at the age of 85, Arnup suffered a stroke while modelling a horse for a large scale sculpture at stables near Thirsk. She later died in York Hospital from septicaemia.

Works in collections

References 

1930 births
2015 deaths
20th-century English sculptors
21st-century English sculptors
20th-century English women artists
21st-century English women artists
Alumni of Camberwell College of Arts
Alumni of Kingston University 
Alumni of the Royal College of Art 
English women sculptors
Sculptors from London